Drago Matulaj (18 February 1911 – 14 February 1996) was a Croatian rower. He competed in the men's double sculls event at the 1936 Summer Olympics.

References

1911 births
1996 deaths
Croatian male rowers
Olympic rowers of Yugoslavia
Rowers at the 1936 Summer Olympics
People from Gradiška, Bosnia and Herzegovina